Special Occasion is an album by Smokey Robinson & The Miracles released in 1968. It contains three Top 40 hits: "If You Can Want",  "Yester Love", and "Special Occasion". Also included are versions of the Motown hits "I Heard It Through the Grapevine" and "Everybody Needs Love" (both made popular by Gladys Knight & The Pips) and The Beatles' "Yesterday". The album's biggest hit was the uptempo "If You Can Want", which just missed the Billboard Pop Top 10 (peaking at #11), and was performed by the group on their first appearance on The Ed Sullivan Show in 1968. The Miracles were actually the first group to record "I Heard It Through the Grapevine", before the later hit versions by Marvin Gaye and Gladys Knight & the Pips were done, although the master used on this album is a re-recorded version prepared following the release of the Pips' version. This album also includes the popular Miracles regional hit "B" sides, “Much Better Off” (which inspired a cover version by late rapper J Dilla), and “Give Her Up”. “Give Her Up” first appeared on Martha & The Vandellas‘ 1963 album Come And Get These Memories as “Give Him Up”.

Track listing

Side one
 "Yester Love" (Smokey Robinson, Al Cleveland)
 "If You Can Want" (Robinson)
 "Special Occasion" (Robinson, Cleveland)
 "Everybody Needs Love" (Norman Whitfield, Edward Holland, Jr.)
 "Just Losing You" (Robinson)
 "Give Her Up" (Robinson)

Side two
 "I Heard It Through the Grapevine" (Whitfield, Barrett Strong)
 "Yesterday" (John Lennon, Paul McCartney)
 "Your Mother's Only Daughter" (Robinson, Cleveland)
 "Much Better Off" (Smokey Robinson, Warren Moore)
 "You Only Build Me Up To Tear Me Down" (Robinson)

Personnel
The Miracles
 Smokey Robinson – lead vocals, producer, executive producer
 Ronnie White – background vocals
Bobby Rogers – background vocals
Warren "Pete" Moore – background vocals
Claudette Robinson – background vocals
 Marv Tarplin  – guitarist

Additional
 Norman Whitfield, producer ("Everybody Needs Love", "I Heard It Through the Grapevine")
 The Funk Brothers – instrumentation

References

1968 albums
The Miracles albums
Tamla Records albums
Albums produced by Norman Whitfield
Albums produced by Smokey Robinson
Albums recorded at Hitsville U.S.A.